Hugh d'Orevalle (died either 1084 or 1085) was a medieval Bishop of London.

From a family originating in the village of Orival (Aurea Valle) in Normandy, he was elected after 29 August 1075. He died in 1084 or 1085, with his death being commemorated on 12 January — his death year is recorded as 1084 Old Style (i.e. 25 March 108424 March 1085), so he may very well have died 12 January 1085 (New Style).

Notes

Citations

References
 
 
 

Bishops of London
1080s deaths
Year of birth unknown
Place of birth unknown
Place of death missing
Anglo-Normans
11th-century English Roman Catholic bishops